Martin Late at Nite (stylized as Martin Late @ Nite) was a nightly musical-talk show that aired on ABS-CBN from September 7, 1998, to August 29, 2003.

Final host
 Martin Nievera

References

ABS-CBN original programming
1998 Philippine television series debuts
2003 Philippine television series endings
English-language television shows
Filipino-language television shows
Philippine television talk shows